Hampton School is an all-girls boarding school located in Malvern, Jamaica. It is one of the oldest boarding schools in Jamaica, and was founded in 1858, two years after its all boys counterpart Munro College. The school was originally named Fort-Rose, and was constructed from funds received from the Munro and Dickenson Trust. The school's motto is in Latin, "Summa Virtute Et Humanitate", which means: "With Utmost Courage and Courtesy".

History
On 21 January 1797 Robert Munro left a residuary request in his will, addressed to his nephew Caleb Dickenson and the Churchwardens of St Elizabeth. Included were instructions to establish a school for the marginalized children in St. Elizabeth. In his lifetime Dickenson would augment his uncle's estate, increasing its value. Upon his death in 1821, Dickenson left instructions in his will for the trustees of his wealth to perform his uncle's wishes.

This request would go unaddressed until 1855, when a new Trustee Board was established, known as "The Governors and Trustees of Munro and Dickenson Free School and Charity". In 1856 an all-boys school named Potsdam College was erected in Black River; later removed to Potsdam in 1857 and renamed to Munro College during World War I. In 1858, a year later, an all-girls school was erected on the same campus.  This all-girls school was known as Fort-Rose.

The location of the all-girls school was moved several times, first to Torrington, then to Mt-Zion. The institution saw a change in 1885, moving to Malvern House. It would not reach its final and current location, Hampton, property of the Boxer family, until 1891. The year 1891 holds further significance in being the date of the renaming of the school to Hampton School for Girls. In 1896, on the decease of Mr. Boxer, the Hampton property was purchased by the Munroe and Dickenson Trust for £800.

Historic Buildings 
Chapel

The Hampton School Chapel was built over a 10-year timespan (1922 to 1932). The chapel hosts a stained-glass window designed by James Ballantine of Edinburgh. A piece of granite left over from the construction of Usher Hall in Edinburgh was donated by the builder of the Scottish War Memorial, Neil McLeod.

Calder Hall

Calder Hall was officially opened on 8 October 1913, after three and a half years of construction. Its erection was supervised by Henry Maxwell, one of the then trustees of the school. Calder Hall was named after John Vassal Calder, who served as Chairman of the Trust for more than 30 years.

Notable Hamptonians 

Una Marson
Olive Lewin

Past headmistresses 
 Miss Elizabeth Ramson (1858–84)
 Miss McCutcheon (1885–89)
 Mrs Julia Comrie (Principal)*, Miss Geddes (Headmistress) (1890–93) 
 Miss Holden (1894–1904)
 Miss Maud Barrows (1905–22)
 Miss Campbell (1923–34)
 Mrs Joliette Sutherland (1993 - 2003
 Mrs Heather Murray (2003 -)

* For the period (1890–93) Hampton School had attempted to change its leadership structure, introducing both a Principal and Headmistress in 1890, this was done away with in 1894.

References

External links
 https://web.archive.org/web/20050210112806/http://www.hamptonschool.edu.jm/

Schools in Jamaica
Boarding schools in Jamaica
Educational institutions established in 1858
Girls' schools in Jamaica
Buildings and structures in Saint Elizabeth Parish
1858 establishments in Jamaica